The Prix Médicis is a French literary award given each year in November. It is awarded to an author whose "fame does not yet match his talent."

The award goes to a work of fiction in the French language. In 1970 the Prix Médicis étranger was added to recognize a book published in translation. The Prix Médicis essai has been awarded since 1985 for non-fiction works.

Laureates Prix Médicis
1958 – La Mise en scène – Claude Ollier
1959 – Le Dîner en ville – Claude Mauriac
1960 – John Perkins suivi : d'un scrupule – Henri Thomas
1961 – Le Parc – Philippe Sollers
1962 – Derrière la baignoire – Colette Audry
1963 – Un chat qui aboie – Gérard Jarlot
1964 – L'Opoponax – Monique Wittig
1965 – La Rhubarbe – René-Victor Pilhes
1966 – Une saison dans la vie d'Emmanuel – Marie-Claire Blais, Canada
1967 – Histoire – Claude Simon
1968 – Le Mendiant de Jérusalem – Elie Wiesel, United States
1969 – Dedans – Hélène Cixous
1970 – Sélinonte ou la Chambre impériale – Camille Bourniquel
1971 – L'Irrévolution – Pascal Lainé
1972 – Le Tiers des étoiles – Maurice Clavel
1973 – Paysage de fantaisie – Tony Duvert
1974 – Porporino ou les Mystères de Naples – Dominique Fernandez
1975 –  Le Voyage à Naucratis  – Jacques Almira
1976 – Les États du désert – Marc Cholodenko
1977 – L'Autre Amour – Michel Butel
1978 – La vie mode d'emploi – Georges Perec
1979 – La Nuit zoologique – Claude Durand
1980 – Comptine des Height – Jean Lahougue, who then refused the prize, so it was given to Cabinet-portrait by Jean-Luc Benoziglio
1981 – L'Enfant d'Édouard – François-Olivier Rousseau
1982 – L'Enfer et Cie – Jean-François Josselin
1983 – Cherokee – Jean Echenoz
1984 – Le Diable en tête – Bernard-Henri Lévy
1985 – Naissance d'une passion – Michel Braudeau
1986 – Les Funérailles de la Sardine – Pierre Combescot
1987 – Les Éblouissements – Pierre Mertens, Belgium
1988 – La Porte du fond – Christiane Rochefort
1989 – Le Livre brisé – Serge Doubrovsky
1990 – Les Quartiers d'hiver – Jean-Noël Pancrazi
1991 – La Dérive des sentiments – Yves Simon
1992 – Tlacuilo – Michel Rio
1993 – Sa femme – Emmanuèle Bernheim
1994 – Immobile dans le courant du fleuve – Yves Berger
1995 – La Langue maternelle – Vassilis Alexakis and Le testament français (Dreams of My Russian Summers) – Andreï Makine
1996 – Orlanda – Jacqueline Harpman and L'Organisation – Jean Rolin
1997 – Les Sept Noms du peintre – Philippe Le Guillou
1998 – Le Loup mongol – Homéric
1999 – Mon grand appartement – Christian Oster
2000 – Diabolus in musica – Yann Apperry
2001 – Le Voyage en France – Benoît Duteurtre
2002 – Pas un jour – Anne F. Garréta
2003 – Quatre soldats – Hubert Mingarelli
2004 – La Reine du silence – Marie Nimier
2005 – Fuir – Jean-Phillippe Toussaint
2006 – La promesse – Sorj Chalandon
2007 – La stratégie des antilopes – Jean Hatzfeld
2008 – Là où les tigres sont chez eux – Jean-Marie Blas de Roblès
2009 – L'énigme du retour – Dany Laferrière, Canada
2010 – Naissance d'un pont – Maylis de Kerangal
2011 – Ce qu'aimer veut dire –  Mathieu Lindon
2012 – Féerie générale – Emmanuelle Pireyre
2013 – Il faut beaucoup aimer les hommes – Marie Darrieussecq
2014 – Terminus radieux – Antoine Volodine
2015 – Titus n'aimait pas Bérénice – Nathalie Azoulai
2016 – Laetitia ou la fin des hommes – Ivan Jablonka
2017 – Tiens ferme ta couronne – Yannick Haenel
2018 – Idiotie – Pierre Guyotat
2019 – La Tentation – Luc Lang
2020 – Le Cœur synthétique – Chloé Delaume
2021 – Le Voyage dans l'Est – Christine Angot
2022 – La Treizième Heure – Emmanuelle Bayamack-Tam

Laureates Prix Médicis étranger
 1970 – Saut de la mort – Luigi Malerba, Italy
 1971 – (no award)
 1972 – Cobra – Severo Sarduy, Cuba
 1973 – Life Is Elsewhere – Milan Kundera, Czechoslovakia
 1974 – Libro de Manuel – Julio Cortázar, Argentina
 1975 – Edwin Mullhouse: The Life and Death of an American Writer 1943-1954, by Jeffrey Cartwright – Steven Millhauser, United States
 1976 – The Golden Notebook, Doris Lessing, United Kingdom
 1977 – Le Traité des saisons – Hector Bianciotti, Argentina
 1978 – L'Avenir radieux – Aleksandr Zinovyev, Soviet Union
 1979 – La harpe et l'ombre – Alejo Carpentier, Cuba
 1980 – A Dry White Season – André Brink, South Africa
 1981 – Le Jour de la comtesse – David Shahar, Israel
 1982 – The Name of the Rose – Umberto Eco, Italy
 1983 – La route bleue – Kenneth White, United Kingdom
 1984 – Aracoeli – Elsa Morante, Italy
 1985 – God Knows – Joseph Heller, United States
 1986 – Adventures in the Alaskan Skin Trade – John Hawkes, United States
 1987 – Indian Nocturne (French title: Nocturne indien) – Antonio Tabucchi, Italy
 1988 – Les Maîtres anciens – Thomas Bernhard, Austria
 1989 – La Neige de l'amiral – Álvaro Mutis, Colombia
 1990 – The Circle of Reason (French Title: Les feux du Bengale) – Amitav Ghosh, India
 1991 – none
 1992 – Wartime Lies (French title: Une education polonaise) – Louis Begley, United States
 1993 – Leviathan – Paul Auster, United States
 1994 – Frère Sommeil – Robert Schneider, Austria
 1995 – Châteaux de la colère – Alessandro Baricco, Italy
 1996 – Himmelfarb – Michael Kruger, Germany and Sonietchka – Lyudmila Ulitskaya, Russia
 1997 – The Tortilla Curtain (French title: America) – T. Coraghessan Boyle, United States
 1998 – The House of Sleep – Jonathan Coe, United Kingdom
 1999 – Le capitaine et les rêves – Bjorn Larsson, Sweden
 2000 – Anil's Ghost – Michael Ondaatje, Canada
 2001 – La noce du poète – Antonio Skarmeta, Chile
 2002 – The Human Stain – Philip Roth, United States
 2003 – Le Mal de Montano – Enrique Vila-Matas, Spain
 2004 – Histoire d'une vie – Aharon Appelfeld, Israel
 2005 – Snow (French title: Neige) – Orhan Pamuk, Turkey
 2006 – Return of the Hooligan – Norman Manea, Romania
 2007 – The Lost: A Search for Six of Six Million (French title: Les disparus) – Daniel Mendelsohn, United States
 2008 – Un garçon parfait – Alain Claude Sulzer, Switzerland
 2009 – What Is the What: The Autobiography of Valentino Achak Deng (French title: Le Grand Quoi) – Dave Eggers, United States
 2010 – Sukkwan Island – David Vann, United States
 2011 – To the End of the Land (French title: Une femme fuyant l'annonce) – David Grossman, Israel
 2012 – Spanish Charity (French title: Rétrospective) – A. B. Yehoshua, Israel 
 2013 – Op zee (French title: En mer) - Toine Heijmans, Netherlands.
 2014 – Lola Bensky – Lily Brett, Australia.
 2015 – Encore – Hakan Günday, Turkey
 2016 – Les Elus – Steve Sem-Sandberg, Sweden.
 2017 – Les huit montagnes – Paolo Cognetti, Italy
 2018 – The Mars Room (French title: Le Mars Club) - Rachel Kushner, United States
 2019 – Miss Islande –  Audur Ava Olafsdottir, Iceland
 2020 – Un andar solitario entre la gente (French title: Un promeneur solitaire dans la foule) - Antonio Muñoz Molina, Spain
2021 – La Clause paternelle – Jonas Hassen Khemiri
2022 – Grey Bees (French title: Les abeilles grises) – Andrey Kurkov

Laureates Prix Médicis essai
 1985 – Les Cinq Sens – Michel Serres
 1986 – Le Perroquet de Flaubert – Julian Barnes
 1987 – Le Soleil sur Aubiac – Georges Borgeaud
 1988 – No Winner Awarded
 1989 – Traité des courtes merveilles – Václav Jamek
 1990 – Shakespeare : les feux de l'envie (A Theatre of Envy: William Shakespeare) – René Girard
 1991 – La Valse des éthiques – Alain Etchegoyen
 1992 – Le Nouvel Ordre écologique – Luc Ferry
 1993 – La Sculpture de soi – Michel Onfray
 1994 – Pour Jean Prévost – Jérôme Garcin
 1995 – La tentation de l'innocence – Pascal Bruckner
 1996 – L'Horreur économique – Viviane Forrester
 1997 – Siècle des intellectuels –  Michel Winock
 1998 – Une histoire de la lecture – Alberto Manguel, Canada
 1999 – Gens de la Tamise et d'autres rivages – Christine Jordis
 2000 – Le Zoo des philosophes – Armelle Lebras-Chopard
 2001 – Secrets de jeunesse – Edwy Plenel
 2002 – Kafka et les jeunes filles – Daniel Desmarquet
 2003 – Morts imaginaires – Michel Schneider
 2004 – Aurore et George – Diane de Margerie
 2005 – La Vie sauve – Lydie Violet and Marie Desplechin
 2006 – Frère du précédent – Jean-Bertrand Pontalis
 2007 – L'Année de la pensée magique – Joan Didion, United States
 2008 – Warhol Spirit – Cécile Guilbert
 2009 – Mémoire d'un fou d'Emma – Alain Ferry
 2010 – Les Couleurs de nos souvenirs – Michel Pastoureau
 2011 – Dans les forêts de Sibérie – Sylvain Tesson
 2012 – Congo – David van Reybrouck
 2013 –  La Fin de l'homme rouge ou le temps du désenchantement (Время секонд хэнд) - Svetlana Alexievich
 2014 – Manifeste incertain 3 – Frédéric Pajak
 2015 – Sauve qui peut la vie – Nicole Lapierre
 2016 – Boxe – 
 2017 – Celui qui va vers elle ne revient pas – Shulem Deen
 2018 – Les Frères Lehman – Stefano Massini
 2019 – J'ai oublié – Bulle Ogier and Anne Diatkine
 2020 – Fin de combat – Karl Ove Knausgaard
 2021 – Comme un ciel en nous – Jakuta Alikavazovic
 2022 – Le Témoin jusqu'au bout – Georges Didi-Huberman

References

French fiction awards
Non-fiction literary awards
Awards established in 1958
1958 establishments in France